Mourid Barghouti (8 July 1944 – 14 February 2021) was a Palestinian poet and writer.

Biography

Barghouti was born in Deir Ghassana, near Ramallah, on the West Bank, in 8 July 1944. He studied English literature at Cairo University, graduating in 1967, though he was exiled from Egypt in 1977.

The Oslo Accords finally allowed Barghouti to return to the West Bank, and in 1996 he returned to Ramallah after 30 years of exile. This event inspired his autobiographical novel Ra'aytu Ram Allah (I Saw Ramallah), published by Dar Al Hilal (Cairo, 1997), which won him the Naguib Mahfouz Medal for Literature in the same year. A follow-up, I Was Born There, I Was Born Here was written when he and his son, Tamim, made a visit to the city.

In an interview with Maya Jaggi in The Guardian, Barghouti was quoted as saying: "I learn from trees. Just as many fruits drop before they're ripe, when I write a poem I treat it with healthy cruelty, deleting images to take care of the right ones."

Barghouti was married to the novelist Radwa Ashour, with whom he had a son, the poet Tamim Barghouti. He died in Amman on 14 February 2021, aged 76.

Bibliography
English translations:

 Midnight and Other Poems, translated by Radwa Ashour, ARC Publications, UK, October 2008, 
 I Was Born There, I Was Born Here, Bloomsbury, 2011
 I Saw Ramallah Random House, Anchor Books, 2003-05-13  and Bloomsbury, UK,  and the American University in Cairo Press (January 2003), 
 A Small Sun, Poems translated by Radwa Ashour and W. S. Merwin, Aldeburgh Poetry Trust, 2003 paperback, Suffolk, UK, 
Contributor to A New Divan: A Lyrical Dialogue Between East and West. 

Spanish translations:

 Medianoche (poetry), translated by Luis Miguel Canada, published by Fundacion Antonio Perez. UCLM, Cuenca, Spain, 2006,  and 
 He visto Ramala, translated by Iñaki Gutierrez de Teran, published by Ediciones del oriente y del mediterraneo, Guadarrama, Spain, 2002,  and

References

External links
  Mourid Barghouti Official Website
 Mourid Barghouti: Bio, excerpts, interviews and articles in the archives of the Prague Writers' Festival
 Mourid Barghouti, "Viewpoint: I'm Palestinian - but where am I from?" BBC, 12 November 2011.
 I Was Born There, I Was Born Here: Review of Mourid Barghouti's book.

1944 births
2021 deaths
20th-century Palestinian poets
Palestinian memoirists
Recipients of the Naguib Mahfouz Medal for Literature
21st-century Palestinian poets
Palestinian male poets
20th-century male writers
21st-century male writers
People from Bani Zeid al-Gharbia